Dead Mountaineer's Hotel is a 1979 Soviet era Estonian film directed by Grigori Kromanov and based on the 1970 novel Dead Mountaineer's Hotel by Arkady and Boris Strugatsky, who also wrote the screenplay.

Production
The film was directed by Grigori Kromanov, with his wife Irena Veisaitė acting as assistant director while taking a sabbatical year from university. It was filmed between 1978 and 1979 in Kazakhstan, and set in a fictional western country. Lead actor Uldis Pūcītis, who did not speak Estonian, had his lines dubbed by Estonian actor and theatre teacher Aarne Üksküla.

Plot
Due to an anonymous call, Inspector Glebsky travels to the hotel "Dead Mountaineer's." This hotel is situated in a mountainous region of a secluded valley in a European nation. Simply put, the hotel's name, "Dead Mountaineer's," refers to the fact that a climber perished here after falling from a cliff. He left only his faithful dog behind - a St. Bernard called Lel. In the hotel there is a rather bleak portrait of the climber near which faithful Lel likes to sleep.

Almost all of the lodgers are rather strange, especially Mr. and Mrs. Moses and Olaf Andvarafors. Later another strange individual materializes; Luarvik, who can not even utter a couple of words. Mr. Moses and Luarvik turn out to be aliens and Mrs. Moses and Olaf are their robots, although they look like ordinary people. And in the mountains they suffer a calamity.

After a heavy snowfall, when the hotel is cut off from the outside world, a body appears at one point. Inspector Glebsky initiates an investigation, using all of his standard skills. However the investigation of the pseudo-murder of Olaf comes to a standstill. And when seemingly all intricacies of the plot unravel and the aliens can safely leave the Earth a military helicopter appears.

The inspector has a chance to do great service to the aliens, but Glebsky behaves like a typical cop, subordinate only to common sense and official instructions which leads to the tragic outcome.

At the end of the film the inspector is plagued by doubts whether he did everything he could.

Reception and analysis
Eva Näripea and Henriette Cederlöf, in a 2015 article on the film, viewed it as a blend of science fiction and film noir, the latter particularly in its visual aesthetics. They also viewed the film as "[touching] upon the inherent tensions and social anxieties of the 'crudely communist' Soviet regime" and "Soviet nationalism and the threat it poses to the language, culture and the very existence of non-Russian ethnic groups". Gender identity was also a theme that they identified in the film, commenting on its "apparent denial of heteronormativity as the sole accepted coordinate system for sexual identity", which "parallels its obvious denunciation of oppressive power relations and the attempts by Soviet authorities to combat all kinds of otherness, including of ideological and ethnic origin".

Cast
Uldis Pūcītis - Inspector Peter Glebsky 
Jüri Järvet - Alex Snewahr 
Lembit Peterson - Simon Simonet 
Mikk Mikiver - Hinckus 
Kārlis Sebris - Mr. Moses 
Irena Kriauzaitė - Mrs. Moses 
Sulev Luik - Luarvik 
Tiit Härm - Olaf Andvarafors 
Nijolė Oželytė - Brun 
Kaarin Raid - Kaisa

Awards
Best cinematography (Jüri Sillart), USSR Film Competition (Shostka), 1979
Best cinematography (Jüri Sillart), Estonian SSR Film Festival, 1980
Best art design (Tõnu Virve), Estonian SSR Film Festival, 1980
Jury Special Prize for novel expression in film music (Sven Grünberg), Estonian SSR Film Festival, 1980

References

External links
 

Films based on works by Arkady and Boris Strugatsky
Soviet science fiction films
1979 films
Films based on Russian novels
Estonian-language films
Soviet-era Estonian films
1970s crime films
1970s science fiction films
Films set in hotels
Tallinnfilm films
Estonian science fiction films
Films based on science fiction novels
Films directed by Grigori Kromanov